Gandhi Nagar is a locality situated in Bangalore. It is a bustling neighbourhood of Central Bangalore.

Administration
Gandhi Nagar is a part of ward number 94 of the Bruhat Bengaluru Mahanagara Palike (BBMP). The Gandhi Nagar ward falls under the Gandhinagar assembly constituency and the Bangalore Central parliamentary constituency. The ward has a total area of 1.93 km2. Per the 2011 Census, the ward had a population of 31,208, with 6,599 households. The population of the ward declined by 11.60% from 2001 to 2011.

The following localities are a part of the Gandhi Nagar ward: Seshadripuram, Ramakrishna Layout, Nehru Nagar, VV Giri Colony, Bangalore City, Kempegowda Bus Station, R.K. Puram, Gandhinagar, Srirampuram, Okalipuram, Ramachandrapuram, Upparpet, Chikpete.

References

Neighbourhoods in Bangalore